was a Japanese professional baseball third basemen and manager for the Nankai Hawks of Nippon Professional Baseball (NPB). He was named manager of the Hawks in November 1965, but died of a sleeping pill overdose later that month.

References

External links

1927 births
1965 deaths
Japanese baseball players
Nippon Professional Baseball Rookie of the Year Award winners
Nippon Professional Baseball infielders
Nankai Hawks players
Drug-related deaths in Japan
Nippon Professional Baseball managers
Baseball people from Osaka
Waseda University alumni